Kiyevsky is an urban locality (an urban-type settlement) in Troitsky Administrative Okrug of the federal city of Moscow, Russia. Population:

References

Urban-type settlements in Moscow (federal city)
Troitsky Administrative Okrug